Arnold v Britton  is an English contract law case on implied terms.

Facts
Paddy Arnold, landlord of Oxwich Leisure Park, near Swansea, claimed Britton, the tenant with 42 others, should pay service repairs at 10% increases every year, as their contract expressly stated. Britton and others had leases for holiday chalets for 99 years from 1974. The total number of properties concerned being 25 (The lessee may be one or more persons).

Evidence 

Each lease said it was granted ‘upon terms similar in all respects’ to other leases, and clause 3 said tenants should repair the chalets, for each other's benefit. Clause 4(8) put a covenant on the lessors that covenants were the same. For a first group of leases, clause 3(2) said a lessee should pay ‘a proportionate part of the expenses’ for repairs and services, at £90 a year, increasing at a three-year compound rate of 10%. But in a second group, it said the repair rate should be increased by 10% every year. Those tenants claimed in 2011 that, with the annual service charge over £2,700 (compared to the first group that was still paying £282 a year), their clause 3(2) should be reinterpreted as requiring a variable sum in fair proportion to the cost of the services, and a specified sum no more than a capped maximum. Arnold brought proceedings under CPR Part 8 to declare clause 3(2) required what it said.

The County Court judge accepted the tenants’ claim.

The High Court held that on a natural reading, it was what it said and he could not rewrite the bargain. Given the high levels of inflation when the deals were signed, it could not be said that the 10% annual rate lacked commercial purpose.

The Court of Appeal affirmed High Court that the tenants were bound to pay the charge.

Judgment
The majority of the Supreme Court (Lord Neuberger, Lord Sumption, Lord Hughes, Lord Hodge) dismissed the appeal and affirmed Britton and others were bound to pay the escalating repair costs. The less clear the words, the more the court could depart from natural meaning, but it was not to try and exploit bad drafting. The purpose of interpretation was to identify what the parties had agreed, not what the court thinks they should have agreed. The court's function was not to relieve parties of the consequences of imprudence or poor advice. In clause 3(2) the natural meaning was clear. So the landlord was entitled to the declaration that the contract was binding. Lord Neuberger said the following.

Lord Hodge gave a concurring judgment.

Lord Carnwath dissented.

On Appeal from Cardiff District Registry, Morgan J, HC06C02169

See also
Rainy Sky SA v Kookmin Bank
Chartbrook Ltd v Persimmon Homes Ltd
Investors Compensation Scheme Ltd v West Bromwich Building Society

Notes

References

External links

English contract case law